Events in the year 1956 in Norway.

Incumbents
 Monarch – Haakon VII
 Regent – Olav, due to debilitating injury to the King
 Prime Minister – Einar Gerhardsen (Labour Party)

Events

 7 March – Several avalanches kill 21 people and causing heavy damage in Nordland and Troms.
 9 April – The Norwegian Humanist Association is founded.
 12 October – The Norwegian motor vehicle manufacturer Troll Plastik & Bilindustri presents the first Troll car in Telemark.

Popular culture

Sports
Roald Aas, speed skater and Olympic gold medallist and cyclist, is awarded the Egebergs Ærespris for his achievements as both a speed skater and a cyclist.

Music

Film

Literature
The Song of the Red Ruby (original title Sangen om den røde rubin), novel by Agnar Mykle

Notable births 
  

9 January – Thorhild Widvey, politician 
13 January – Bjørn Stordrange, jurist and politician 
13 January – Torun Lian, playwright, film director and novelist 
13 January – Harald Stanghelle, newspaper editor
22 January – Tomm Kristiansen, journalist 
24 January – Hanne Krogh, singer and actress 
24 January – Helge Skaara, civil servant and diplomat 
29 January – Odd Omland, politician 
1 February – Bente Stein Mathisen politician  
1 February – Kjell Otto Moe, fencer 
3 February – Tom Christiansen, ski jumper 
8 February – Kjersti Holmen, actress 
8 February – Eldar Sætre, businessman 
9 February – Solfrid Johansen, sport rower 
16 February – Stein Kollshaugen, footballer 
18 February – Frøystein Gjesdal, educator
18 February – Jan Haaland, educator
18 February – Ivar Kristiansen, politician 
22 February – Harald Aabrekk, footballer
22 February – Ivar Hognestad, politician 
28 February (in Denmark) – Jens Wendelboe, trombonist, composer, music arranger and orchestra leader 
1 March – Lars Steinar Ansnes, newspaper editor 
2 March – Jan Georg Iversen, cyclist 
2 March – Torgrim Sørnes, physician, historian and writer 
10 March – Sidsel Ekholdt, artistic gymnast 
12 March – Ove Aunli, cross-country skier
13 March – Geir-Ketil Hansen, politician 
20 March – Minken Fosheim, actress and children's author
21 March – Ingrid Kristiansen, long-distance runner
25 March – Bente Grønli, disability athlete (d. 1996)
25 March – Tom Holthe, politician 
8 April – Jan Roger Skyttesæter, archer  
10 April – Grethe Mathiesen swimmer 
10 April – Torhild Bransdal, politician (died 2022).
11 April – Kristin Mile, jurist and civil servant
11 April – Reidar Sørensen, stage actor and film actor
12 April – Tor Olav Blostrupmoen, politician 
13 April – Knut H. Kallerud, lawyer and judge 
14 April – Rune Belsvik, novelist, playwright, short story writer and children's writer 
14 April – Knut N. Kjær, economist
15 April – Jim Marthinsen, ice hockey player 
18 April – Olemic Thommessen, politician 
25 April – Gro Sandberg, artistic gymnast 
27 April – Magne Rommetveit, politician
27 April – Elisabeth Walaas, civil servant, diplomat and politician
29 April – Sten Ture Jensen, magazine editor and investor 
29 April – Morgan Lindstrøm, artist, composer, and synthesizer-performer
29 April – Ketil Stokkan, pop artist
4 May – Rune Resaland, diplomat
7 May – John Ole Aspli, politician 
9 May – Anne Helene Gjelstad, photographer and fashion designer 
13 May – Anne Kristin Sydnes, politician (d. 2017)
19 May – Geir Digerud, cyclist 
20 May – Ingvar Ambjørnsen, writer 
20 May – Pål Jacobsen, footballer
21 May – Gunnar Gundersen, politician 
21 May – Kai G. Henriksen, businessman (d. 2016)
22 May – Eva Isaksen, film director
22 May – May Irene Olsen, sport shooter  
1 June – Stephan Barratt-Due, violinist 
9 June – Berit Aunli, cross-country skier
13 June – Olav Sigurd Kjesbu, fisheries biologist 
15 June – Tron Erik Hovind, politician 
18 June – Christen Sveaas, businessman 
19 June – Jon Rangfred Hanssen, racing cyclist 
19 June – Nils Johnson, actor and theatre director 
24 June – Turid Leirvoll, politician 
28 June – Per Bergerud, ski jumper 
28 June – Inger Giskeødegård, illustrator 
30 June – Olav Gjelsvik, philosopher 
4 July – Rita H. Roaldsen, politician 
6 July – Dag Olav Hessen, writer and biologist 
7 July – Øystein Wiik, actor, singer and novelist
9 July – Anne Bøe, poet
10 July – Anders Heger, publisher and writer
16 July – Einar Rasmussen, sprint canoeist  
19 July – Marit Sandvik, jazz singer
21 July – Sverre Quale, civil servant and businessman
22 July – Stein Erik Hagen, businessman
22 July – Morten Jentoft, journalist
29 July – Olav Øygard, Lutheran prelate
4 August – Nina Søby, cyclist
8 August – Michael Momyr, politician 
10 August – Lars Martin Myhre, composer, guitarist, pianist, singer and producer
11 August – Norunn Tveiten Benestad, politician 
11 August – Lars Ødegård, organizational leader and politician 
12 August – Marit Westergaard, linguist 
15 August – Inge Ryan, politician
17 August – Sissel Grottenberg, long-distance runner 
20 August – Jan Henry T. Olsen, politician (d. 2018)
23 August – Valgerd Svarstad Haugland, politician and Minister
28 August – Cindy Haug, writer (d. 2018).
29 August – Bernt Rougthvedt, historian, biographer and thriller/crime writer (d. 2019)
1 September – Hilde Hefte, jazz singer
5 September – Eva Lian, politician
7 September – Eilif Nedberg, luger
8 September – Eivin One Pedersen, jazz musician (d. 2012)
12 September – Dag Otto Lauritzen, cyclist 
15 September – Otto Gregussen, politician 
17 September – Bjørn Rune Gjelsten, businessman and Offshore powerboat racing World Champion 
18 September – Odd Lirhus, biathlete
19 September – Eivind Aadland, conductor and violinist 
20 September – Svein Inge Valvik, discus thrower
22 September – Reidar Lorentzen, javelin thrower 
22 September – Hans Henrik Scheel, social economist and civil servant
24 September – Anette S. Olsen, businesswoman
28 September – Helge Holden, mathematician 
30 September – Sven-Roald Nystø, politician 
1 October – Terje Krokstad, biathlete
2 October – Jan-Henrik Fredriksen, politician 
5 October – Tor Erik Jenstad, linguist, dictionary editor, and traditional Norwegian folk musician
9 October – Geir Langslet, jazz pianist and band leader 
10 October – Bjørn Erik Hollevik, politician
20 October – Arne O. Holm, journalist and newspaper editor 
21 October – Arne Sandstø, footballer
22 October – Olav Gunnar Ballo, politician
23 October – Svein Dag Hauge, jazz musician 
27 October – Finn Skårderud, psychiatrist 
1 November – Anne Sender, lecturer and debater 
4 November – Harald Magnus Andreassen, economist
5 November – Ketil Gudim, dancer and actor
7 November (in the Soviet Union) – Mikhail Alperin, Soviet-Norwegian jazz pianist (d. 2018)
8 November – Mari Boine, Sami musician
8 November – Jon Gunnes, politician
14 November – Bjørgulv Braanen, newspaper editor
15 November – Maj Britt Andersen, singer  
24 November (in India) – Nita Kapoor, Indian-Norwegian cultural director 
29 November – Jørgen Sørlie, footballer 
1 December – Lars Ole Vaagen, civil servant and diplomat 
3 December – Morten Søgård, curler
8 December – Liv Steen, actress
9 December – Kari Bremnes, singer and songwriter
10 December – Øystein Hauge, writer 
12 December – Geir Holmsen, jazz musician 
18 December – Bent Hamer, film director 
21 December – Bjarne Berntsen, footballer 
22 December – Arne Gilje, competition rower and twice World Champion 
22 December – Signe Iversen, Sami language consultant and author of children's literature 
25 December – Isak Arne Refvik, footballer
31 December – Torolf Nordbø, musician and comedian

Full date missing
Eivind Aadland, conductor and violinist
Iulie Aslaksen, economist 
Kate Augestad, singer 
Ivar Braut, theologian and priest
Laila Brenden, writer
Olav Rune Ekeland Bastrup, writer and historian
Leif-Arne Langøy, businessman 
Per Roger Lauritzen, non-fiction writer
Arne Tovik, journalist (d. 2009)
Elsbeth Tronstad, businesswoman and politician

Notable deaths

5 January – Caroline Boman Hansen, Swedish–Norwegian hotelier (b. 1860).
15 January – Bertram Dybwad Brochmann, businessperson, writer and politician (b. 1881).
18 January – Frantz Rosenberg, sport shooter (b. 1883) 
25 January – Schak Bull, architect (born 1858)
27 January – Harald Heide, violinist, conductor, and composer (b. 1876)
29 January – Ole Holm, rifle shooter (b. 1870) 
31 January – Sigvald Svendsen, politician (born 1895)
1 February – Carl Platou, civil servant and politician (b. 1885)
19 February – Marit Aarum, economist, liberal politician, civil servant and feminist (b. 1903) 
21 February – Paul Christian Frank, barrister, politician, organizer and non-fiction writer (b. 1879).
21 February – August Nielsen, architect (b. 1877)
24 February – Ivar Jørgensen, civil servant and politician (b. 1877)
6 March – Harald Hansen, gymnast (b. 1884)
6 March – Anders Todal, teacher, politician and farmer (b. 1883).
12 March – Reidar Tønsberg, gymnast and Olympic silver medallist (born 1893)
18 March – Ivar Jacobsen Norevik, politician (born 1900)
20 March – Helga Ramstad, politician (b. 1875)
28 March – Erik Colban, diplomat (born 1876)
29 March – Endre Kristian Vestvik, politician (born 1894)
31 March – Robert Sæther, schoolteacher, newspaper editor and politician (b. 1875) 
2 April – Ivar Alnæs, teacher and linguist (b. 1868)
23 April – Anna Bøe, journalist and magazine editor (b. 1864).
25 April – Mikal Grøvan, politician (born 1899)
28 April – Amund Rasmussen Skarholt, politician (born 1892)
2 May – Ingebjørg Øisang, politician (born 1892)
16 May – Christian Staib, sailor and Olympic gold medallist (born 1892)
18 May – Einar Meidell Hopp, broadcasting personality (b. 1899).
31 May – Svend Foyn Bruun Sr., naval officer, ship-owner and whaler, and politician (b. 1883)
1 June – Jens Bull, jurist and diplomat (born 1886)
5 June – Mathias Glomnes, sport shooter (b. 1869)
9 June – Hans Bergsland, fencer, sports official and businessman (b. 1878)
18 June – Niels Christian Ditleff, diplomat (born 1881)
20 June – Willy Gilbert, sailor and Olympic gold medalist (b. 1881)
28 June – Oliver Møystad, engineer, farmer and forest owner (b. 1892) 
30 June – Thorleif Lund, stage and film actor (b. 1880)
30 June – Erling Sandberg, banker and politician (b. 1879)
7 July – Andreas Moe, merchant and politician (b. 1883)
9 July – Lul Krag, painter (b. 1878).
27 July – Arnold Holmboe, politician and Minister (born 1873)
28 August – Johan Nordhagen, artist (born 1856)
7 September – Gudmund Hoel, architect (b. 1877)
22 September – Ewald Bosse, sociologist and economist (b. 1880) 
29 September – Herman Scheel, judge and politician (b. 1859)
13 October – Otto Tangen, Nordic skier (b. 1886)
28 October – Øyvind Alfred Stensrud, politician (born 1887)
12 November – Olaf Skramstad, politician (b. 1894)
14 November – Olaf Stang, engineer (b. 1871)
14 November – Johan Nicolai Støren, bishop (b. 1871)
17 November – Dina Aschehoug, painter (b. 1861)
18 November – Christian Arnesen, wrestler (b. 1890)
3 December – Halvor Floden, schoolteacher, children's writer, novelist, poet and playwright (b. 1884).
8 December – Finn Lambrechts, lieutenant general of the Royal Norwegian Air Force (b. 1900).
12 December – Jakob Friis, politician (born 1883)
16 December – Frithjof Olstad, rower and Olympic bronze medallist (born 1890)
17 December – Lauritz Sand, resistance fighter (born 1879)
18 December – Erik Vangberg, carpenter, trade unionist and politician (b. 1874).
20 December – Hildur Andersen, pianist and music pedagogue (b. 1864) .
21 December – Aksel Refstad, Nordic combined skier (b. 1873)
28 December – Oskar Olsen, speed skater and Olympic silver medallist (born 1897).

Full date missing
Anton Ludvig Alvestad, politician and Minister (born 1883)
Carl Severin Bentzen, tailor and politician (b. 1882)
Sigval Bergesen, ship-owner and politician (born 1863)
Sigurd Christian Brinch, manager and politician (b. 1874)
Eyvind Getz, barrister (b. 1888)
Helmer Hanssen, polar explorer (born 1870)
Halvor Hansson, military officer (b. 1886)
Nikolai Nissen Paus, surgeon (born 1877)
Harald Smedvik, gymnast and Olympic silver medallist (born 1888)

See also

References

External links